Cristoforo Spiriti (died 5 November 1556) was a Roman Catholic prelate who served as Titular Patriarch of Jerusalem (1550–1556), and Bishop of Cesena (1510–1550).

Biography
On 8 April 1510, Cristoforo Spiriti was appointed during the papacy of Pope Julius II as Bishop of Cesena.
On 28 February 1550, he was appointed during the papacy of Pope Julius III as Titular Patriarch of Jerusalem.
He served as Patriarch of Jerusalem until his death on 5 November 1556.

Episcopal succession
While bishop, he was the principal co-consecrator of:
Giovanni Giacomo Barba, Bishop of Teramo (1546);
Bartolomeo Guidiccioni, Bishop of Teramo (1546); and
Giulio Canani, Bishop of Adria (1554).

References

External links and additional sources
 (for Chronology of Bishops) 
 (for Chronology of Bishops) 
 (for Chronology of Bishops) 
 (for Chronology of Bishops) 

16th-century Italian Roman Catholic bishops
Bishops appointed by Pope Julius II
Bishops appointed by Pope Julius III
1556 deaths